The Old Nassau reaction or Halloween reaction is a chemical clock reaction in which a clear solution turns orange and then black. This reaction was discovered by two undergraduate students at Princeton University researching the inhibition of the iodine clock reaction (or Landolt reaction) by Hg2+, resulting in the formation of orange HgI2. Orange and black are the school colors of Princeton University, and "Old Nassau" is a nickname for Princeton, named for its historic administration building, Nassau Hall.

Chemical equation
The reactions involved are as follows:

Na2S2O5 + H2O → 2 NaHSO3
IO3− + 3 HSO3− → I− + 3 SO42− + 3 H+ This reaction reduces iodate ions to iodide ions.
Hg2+ + 2 I− → HgI2 Orange mercury iodide solid is precipitated until the mercury is used up.
IO3− + 5 I− + 6 H+ → 3 I2 + 3 H2O The excess I− and IO3− undergo the iodide-iodate reaction
I2 + starch → a blue/black complex A blue/black starch-iodine complex is formed.

See also
Iodine clock reaction

References

Chemical reactions